Thomas Wilson (1772 – October 4, 1824) was a member of the U.S. House of Representatives from Pennsylvania.

Thomas Wilson was born near Sunbury, Pennsylvania.  He had the contract for supplying the western forts of the United States from Niagara to New Orleans.  He was engaged in shipbuilding in Erie, Pennsylvania, in 1805 and built vessels for commerce on the Great Lakes.  He was burgess of Erie in 1807, town clerk in 1808, treasurer of Erie County from 1809 to 1812, and county commissioner in 1811.  He was also a justice of the peace.

Wilson was elected as a Republican to the Thirteenth Congress to fill the vacancy caused when the representative-elect Abner Lacock resigned before taking his seat.  He was reelected to the Fourteenth Congress.  He was a member of the Pennsylvania House of Representatives from 1817 to 1820.  He was prothonotary and clerk of court of Erie County from 1819 to 1824.  He died in Erie in 1824.

Sources

The Political Graveyard

1772 births
1824 deaths
Members of the Pennsylvania House of Representatives
Politicians from Erie, Pennsylvania
Pennsylvania prothonotaries
Democratic-Republican Party members of the United States House of Representatives from Pennsylvania